Gretchen Donlan (born November 18, 1993) is an American former pair skater. With partner Andrew Speroff, she is the 2013 Ondrej Nepela Trophy champion, 2013 Ice Challenge champion, and 2012 U.S. national pewter medalist. In July 2014, Donlan teamed up with Nathan Bartholomay.

Career

Early years 
Donlan was coached by Mark Mitchell and Peter Johansson from the fourth grade. Until 2009, she competed in singles and won the U.S. national title on the intermediate level in 2007.

Partnership with Speroff 
Donlan and Andrew Speroff were paired together in spring 2009 by coach Bobby Martin. She had two stress fractures in her back for two seasons. The pair made their international debut at the 2010 Nebelhorn Trophy where they finished 4th. They were 8th at the 2011 U.S. Championships.

Donlan/Speroff won the pewter medal at the 2012 U.S. Championships. The next season, they received a Grand Prix assignment, the 2012 Skate America, and finished 6th. The pair took the silver medal at the 2012 Ice Challenge.

In the 2013–14 season, Donlan/Speroff won gold medals at two international events, the 2013 Ondrej Nepela Trophy and 2013 Ice Challenge.

Partnership with Bartholomay 
In July 2014, Donlan teamed up with Nathan Bartholomay. In late October, he underwent surgery to repair a disc and remove bone spurs in his ankle, causing the pair to withdraw from their first assignment, the 2014 CS Ice Challenge. They placed seventh at the 2015 U.S. Championships and concluded their first season with gold at the International Challenge Cup.

In the 2015–16 season, Donlan/Bartholomay appeared at two Challenger Series events, placing fifth at the 2015 U.S. Classic and sixth at the Ondrej Nepela Trophy. They withdrew from their Grand Prix assignment, the 2015 Skate America, after Donlan fell ill with a severe flu. She developed labyrinthitis in her right ear, resulting in vertigo that kept her off the ice for three months and forced the pair to withdraw from the 2016 U.S. Championships. The pair announced the end of their partnership in March 2016. They were coached by Jim Peterson in Ellenton, Florida.

Personal life 
Donlan began attending Boston University in autumn 2012. She is a premed student majoring in chemistry.

Programs

With Bartholomay

With Speroff

Competitive highlights 
GP: Grand Prix; CS: Challenger Series

Pairs career with Bartholomay

Pairs career with Speroff

Singles career

References

External links 
 
 Gretchen Donlan / Andrew Speroff at IceNetwork
 Official website of Donlan / Speroff

1993 births
American female pair skaters
Living people
Figure skaters from Boston
21st-century American women
20th-century American women